Howard Elphinstone may refer to:
Sir Howard Craufurd Elphinstone (1829–1890), Major-General in the Crimean War
Sir Howard Elphinstone, 1st Baronet (1773–1846), Major-General in the Peninsular War
Sir Howard Elphinstone, 2nd Baronet (1804–1893), Liberal MP
Sir Howard Elphinstone, 3rd Baronet (1830–1917), legal academic
Sir Howard Graham Elphinstone, 4th Baronet (1898–1975) of the Elphinstone baronets